"Clap for the Wolfman" is a song written by Burton Cummings, Bill Wallace, and Kurt Winter performed by their band, the Guess Who. The song appeared on their 1974 album, Road Food. 
The song was ranked #84 on Billboard magazine's Top Hot 100 songs of 1974.

Background
The song is an homage to Wolfman Jack, who is featured talking in his typical on-air DJ voice several times on the recording.

Chart history
It reached #4 in Canada and #6 on the Billboard Hot 100 in 1974.  It also reached the top 20 in the Netherlands, Belgium and South Africa.

Weekly charts

Year-end charts

References

External links
 Lyrics of this song
 

1974 songs
1974 singles
Cultural depictions of American men
The Guess Who songs
Songs written by Burton Cummings
Songs written by Kurt Winter
Song recordings produced by Jack Richardson (record producer)
RCA Victor singles